Lord Brownlow may refer to:

 Baron Brownlow, a title in the Peerage of Great Britain
 Peregrine Cust, 6th Baron Brownlow (1899–1978), British peer and courtier
 David Brownlow, Baron Brownlow of Shurlock Row, British entrepreneur and philanthropist